Pristidactylus araucanus is a species of lizard in the family Leiosauridae. The species is endemic to Argentina.

References

Pristidactylus
Reptiles of Argentina
Reptiles described in 1964
Taxa named by José María Alfonso Félix Gallardo